The Rifles is an infantry regiment of the British Army. Formed in 2007, it consists of four Regular battalions and three Reserve battalions, plus a number of companies in other Army Reserve battalions. Each battalion of The Rifles was formerly an individual battalion of one of the two large regiments of the Light Division (with the exception of the 1st Battalion, which is an amalgamation of two individual regiments). Since formation the regiment has been involved in combat operations, first in the later stages of the Iraq War and in the War in Afghanistan.

History
The Rifles was created as a result of the Future Army Structure review. Under the original announcement, the Light Division would have remained essentially unchanged, with the exception of the Light Infantry gaining a new battalion through the amalgamation of two other regiments, and both gaining a reserve battalion from within the Territorial Army (TA) as it was then called. However, on 24 November 2005, the Ministry of Defence announced that the four regiments would amalgamate into a single five-battalion regiment. The regular battalions of The Rifles was formed on 1 February 2007 by the amalgamation of the four Light Infantry and Rifle Regiments of the Light Division as follows:
1st Battalion The Rifles (formed from the 1st Battalion, Devonshire and Dorset Regiment, and the 1st Battalion Royal Gloucestershire, Berkshire and Wiltshire Regiment) 
2nd Battalion The Rifles (formed from the 1st Battalion, Royal Green Jackets)
3rd Battalion The Rifles (formed from the 2nd Battalion, Light Infantry)
4th Battalion The Rifles (formed from the 2nd Battalion, Royal Green Jackets)
5th Battalion The Rifles (formed from the 1st Battalion, Light Infantry)
6th Battalion The Rifles (formed from the Rifle Volunteers)
7th Battalion The Rifles (formed from the Royal Rifle Volunteers minus the Princess of Wales's Royal Regiment Company but with the surviving two Companies (F and G) of 4th (V) and 5th (V) Battalions of the Royal Green Jackets within The London Regiment)

The Rifles was formed to serve as the county regiment of the following counties:

Berkshire
Buckinghamshire
Cornwall
Devon
Dorset
Durham
Gloucestershire
Herefordshire
Oxfordshire
Shropshire
Somerset
South Yorkshire
Wiltshire

The 2nd Battalion, the 3rd Battalion and the 4th Battalion were all deployed in Basra in Iraq during some of the worst fighting of the Iraq War including the withdrawal from Basra Palace in September 2007.

The 1st Battalion undertook a tour in Afghanistan between October 2008 and April 2009, ground holding and mentoring the Afghan National Army in Helmand Province. The 5th Battalion was one of the last British Army units to leave Iraq in May 2009. The 4th Battalion provided reinforcement cover for the elections in Afghanistan and took part in Operation Panther's Claw in the Summer of 2009. At the same time the 2nd Battalion was deployed to Sangin and was relieved in due course by the 3rd Battalion. The 1st battalion returned to the Nahri Sarah District of Afghanistan in April 2011, to then be relieved by the 2nd and 5th battalions in October 2011. In March 2018 the 2nd Battalion returned home after a six-month operational deployment to Iraq in support of Operation Shader.

The regiment's 4th battalion was re-subordinated to the Ranger Regiment on 1 December 2021.

Organisation
The regiment has four regular and three reserve battalions, each configured for a specific infantry role:
1st Battalion, an amalgamation of the 1st Battalion, Devonshire and Dorset Regiment and the 1st Battalion, Royal Gloucestershire, Berkshire and Wiltshire Regiment.  Initially configured in the light role as part of 3 Commando Brigade, it moved to 160th Infantry Brigade and Headquarters Wales under Army 2020, but transferred to the 7th Infantry Brigade and Headquarters East in 2019. Personnel are based at Beachley Barracks, Chepstow.  In 2027 the battalion will move to MoD St Athan
2nd Battalion, a redesignation of the 1st Battalion, Royal Green Jackets. Initially configured in the light role as part of 19 Light Brigade, it moved to 38th (Irish) Brigade under Army 2020, and is now part of the 51st (Scottish) Brigade. Personnel are based at Thiepval Barracks, Lisburn.
3rd Battalion, a redesignation of the 2nd Battalion, The Light Infantry. Initially configured in the light role as part of 52nd Infantry Brigade, it moved to 51st Infantry Brigade and Headquarters Scotland under Army 2020 and is now part of the 1st Armoured Infantry Brigade. Personnel are based at Dreghorn Barracks, Edinburgh.  In 2021 they moved to Catterick Garrison.
5th Battalion – redesignation of the 1st Battalion, The Light Infantry. Configured in the armoured infantry role as part of 20th Armoured Brigade, it will remain as a Warrior battalion under Army 2020. Personnel are based at Bulford Camp.
6th Battalion – redesignation of the Rifle Volunteers. It comes under 7th Infantry Brigade and is paired with 1 RIFLES. Headquarters is at Wyvern Barracks in Exeter.
7th Battalion – redesignation of the Royal Rifle Volunteers, minus the Princess of Wales's Royal Regiment company, plus G Company of the London Regiment (the descendants of the 4th (V) Battalion the Royal Green Jackets). It comes under 20th Armoured Brigade and is paired with 5 RIFLES.
8th Battalion – Formed on 1 November 2017. The battalion primarily covers the areas of County Durham, Yorkshire, Shropshire and Birmingham, with headquarters located in Bishop Auckland, County Durham.

Colonels
The Queen Consort is the Colonel-in-Chief of the Regiment, whilst each battalion has its own Royal Colonel:

List of Colonels-in-Chief
 2007–2020: The Duke of Edinburgh
 From 2020: The Queen Consort

Royal Colonels
 1st Battalion, The Rifles: The Duke of Kent (ex-Colonel-in-Chief, DDLI)
 2nd Battalion, The Rifles: The Duke of Edinburgh
 3rd Battalion, The Rifles: Princess Alexandra, The Hon Lady Ogilvy (ex-Colonel-in-Chief, LI)
 5th Battalion, The Rifles: The Duchess of Edinburgh
 6th Battalion, The Rifles: The Duke of Gloucester
 7th Battalion, The Rifles: The Duchess of Gloucester
 8th Battalion, The Rifles: To be announced

Regimental bands

The regular element of The Rifles maintains a single regular regimental band, the Band and Bugles of The Rifles. The band form one of 14 professional bands within the Royal Corps of Army Music. This was formed by renaming the Band and Bugles of the Light Division, which in itself was an amalgamation of four separate bands:
The Corunna Band of the Light Infantry
The Salamanca Band of the Light Infantry
The Peninsula Band of the Royal Green Jackets
The Normandy Band of the Royal Green Jackets

In addition, the two Army Reserve Battalions maintain their own bands:
The Salamanca Band of the Rifles – 6th Battalion (formerly the Band of the Rifle Volunteers)
The Waterloo Band of the Rifles – 7th Battalion (formerly the Band of the Royal Rifle Volunteers)

Band and Bugles
The Band and Bugles of The Rifles is the most senior band in the regiment based in the Rifles. The central Band of The Rifles are based at Sir John Moore Barracks in Winchester. The band is notable in that buglers accompany the band in the front rank. Since 2016, Major Jason Griffiths has served as the director of the band and bugles.

Salamanca Band (6th Battalion)
The Salamanca Band is a 35-member band based at Exeter, being part of the 6th Reserve Battalion.  The Devonshire and Dorset Regiment formed the former Band of the Rifle Volunteers. It formed the backbone of the Salamanca Band. The band also has a detachment in Truro. In the summer of 2017, the band went on a tour of the Caucasus, visiting Armenia, Azerbaijan and Georgia, performing with the Band of the General Staff, the Band of the National Guard and the Band of the Ministry of Defence respectively for public performances. On the Georgia visit, the band performed Tbiliso, which is the unofficial anthem of the City of Tbilisi, was also performed during a concert on a bridge in the neighborhood of Metekhi. In April 2016, the first musician to serve as an army vocalist came from The Salamanca Band.

Waterloo Band (7th Battalion)
The Waterloo Band is a 35-member band based in Abingdon, being part of the 7th Reserve Battalion. The Waterloo Band has performed at events across the UK and the world such as the Basel Tattoo in 2014.

The Sounding Retreat 
The Sounding Retreat is a form of the Beating Retreat ceremony of the Household Division. The main difference between this ceremony and the regular Beating Retreat is that this is performed by the bugle bands of The Rifles, as well as the former of the bands of the Britain's Light Division. This traditional ceremony (which represents the sounding of Sunset or Retreat in the British Army) has been done on 31 May and 1 June on Horse Guards Parade as recently as 1993 and 2016. Besides the Bugle Band of the Rifles, the Band of the Brigade of Gurkhas also takes part in the ceremony.

Golden threads
As a rifle regiment, a private soldier in The Rifles is known as a Rifleman and Serjeant is spelt in the archaic fashion; the regiment wears a Rifle green beret. A number of golden threads i.e. distinctive honours have been brought into the new regiment from each of its founder regiments:
Croix de Guerre – the French Croix de Guerre ribbon awarded to the Devonshire Regiment in the First World War, and subsequently worn by the Devonshire and Dorset Light Infantry, and also awarded to the King's Shropshire Light Infantry in 1918, is worn on both sleeves of No. 1 and No. 2 dress.
Back Badge – the badge worn on the back of headdress reads Egypt. This was awarded as an honour to the 28th Foot and subsequently worn by the Royal Gloucestershire, Berkshire and Wiltshire Light Infantry. It is worn on the forage cap and side hat; and on the shako of the regimental band and bugles.
Bugle Horn – the bugle horn badge of the Light Infantry, now surmounted by St. Edward's Crown, is the regiment's cap badge.
Maltese Cross – the Maltese Cross of the Royal Green Jackets is worn as a buckle on the cross belt, and will contain the regiment's representative battle honours; currently one space is kept free for future honours. In accordance with the tradition of rifle regiments, the regiment does not carry colours.
Black Buttons – the traditional black buttons of a rifle regiment are worn on all forms of dress with the exception of combat dress.
Double past – the march played when the regiment moves at double time is an amalgam of Keel Row, the double past of the Light Infantry, and The Road to the Isles, the double past of the Royal Green Jackets.

Battle honours
The following battle honours are a representation of the total honours awarded to the regiments which formed The Rifles. These are inscribed on the regiment's belt badge:
Gibraltar, Copenhagen, Plassey, Dettingen, Minden, Quebec, Martinique, Marabout, Peninsula, Waterloo, Afghanistan, Jellalabad, Ferozeshah, Delhi, Lucknow, New Zealand, Pekin, South Africa, Inkerman
Great War: Nonne Boschen, Ypres, Somme, Vittorio Veneto, Megiddo
Second World War: Calais, First Battle of El Alamein, Second Battle of El Alamein, Kohima, Pegasus Bridge, Normandy, Italy 1943–45, Anzio
Imjin, Korea, Iraq 2003

Regimental museum
The regiment's museum is The Rifles Museum at Peninsular Barracks in Winchester.

Alliances
The regiment inherited its alliances from its predecessors, and these alliances are:
 – Les Fusiliers de Sherbrooke
 – The Royal Canadian Regiment
 – Princess Patricia's Canadian Light Infantry
 – The Lincoln and Welland Regiment
 – The Algonquin Regiment (Northern Pioneers)
 – The Royal Hamilton Light Infantry (Wentworth Regiment)
 – Le Régiment de Maisonneuve
 – The North Saskatchewan Regiment
 – The British Columbia Regiment (Duke of Connaught's Own)
 – The Queen's Own Rifles of Canada
 – The Brockville Rifles
 – The Royal Winnipeg Rifles
 – The Royal Regina Rifles
 – 11th/28th Battalion, Royal Western Australia Regiment
 – Western Australia University Regiment
 – Sydney University Regiment
 – Melbourne University Regiment
 – Royal New South Wales Regiment
 – Hauraki Regiment
 – 1st Battalion, Royal New Zealand Infantry Regiment
 – 2nd/4th Battalion, Royal New Zealand Infantry Regiment
 – 3rd/6th Battalion, Royal New Zealand Infantry Regiment
 – 5th/7th Battalion, Royal New Zealand Infantry Regiment
 – Kenya Army Infantry
 – 1st Battalion, Kenyan Rifles
 – 3rd Battalion, Kenyan Rifles
 – 6th Battalion, Royal Malay Regiment
 – 1st Battalion, Sindh Regiment
 – 2nd Battalion, Frontier Force Regiment
 – 13th Battalion, Frontier Force Regiment
 – 11th Battalion, Baloch Regiment
 – 13th Battalion, Baloch Regiment
 – Chief Langalibalele Rifles
 – Rand Light Infantry
 – Durban Light Infantry
 – Buffalo Volunteer Rifles
 – Fiji Infantry Regiment
 – 1st Battalion, Ghana Regiment
 – Special Mobile Force

Bond of Friendship
 – 5 South African Infantry Battalion
 – 2e Régiment Étranger d'Infanterie
 – A Flight, No. 22 Squadron RAF

Order of precedence

Lineage

See also
Pegasus Bridge

References

Further reading
Ben Barry A Cold War: Front-line Operations in Bosnia 1995–1996 . An account of the end of the Bosnian Civil War by the CO of the 2nd Battalion the Light Infantry
Les Howard Winter Warriors – Across Bosnia with the PBI . A TA Royal Green Jacket on operations with the 2nd Bn the Light Infantry
Swift and Bold: A Portrait of the Royal Green Jackets 1966–2007 .
Steven McLaughlin Squaddie: A Soldier's Story . A Royal Green Jacket's account of modern-day basic training, battalion life & culture, and operational tours in Iraq and Northern Ireland.

External links

Official site
Official News site

 
The Light Infantry
Infantry regiments of the British Army
Rifle regiments
Military units and formations established in 2007
British light infantry
Military units and formations of the Iraq War
Military units and formations of the United Kingdom in the War in Afghanistan (2001–2021)
Musical instrument museums
2007 establishments in the United Kingdom